Epicloud is the fifteenth studio album by Canadian musician Devin Townsend, and the fifth album in the Devin Townsend Project series. The album was released on September 18, 2012, in North America, and September 24, 2012, in Europe, through his independent record label HevyDevy Records and Inside Out Music.

Background
In an interview with Soundwave TV, Townsend discussed how Epicloud was conceived: "In this sort of process of writing that I've discovered that I guess I'm capable of now, with a sober frame of mind, part of that is just not second-guessing it, so if I write something like that, I just do it, and just finish it."

He continued, "Over the past couple of years, I thought, 'OK, I've gotta write this next 'Ziltoid' thing; I'm inspired to make this epic space opera and, like, really overdo it, and make it really dark.' And so I sat down to write, but every time I went to write, I'd write some poppy hard rock thing. And I was like, 'OK, we'll get that one out of the way and then I'll write 'Ziltoid'.' And I got it out of the way and I'd go write 'Ziltoid'. And I'd write another one. So I'm thinking, 'OK, it's pretty obvious to me that I've got this that wants to come out before that.'"

Regarding the musical direction of Epicloud, Townsend told Noisecreep, "Over the course of the full record, there's sort of new age-y stuff, jazzy stuff, really heavy stuff. We basically cover the gamut. Epicloud is the first record that I felt confident enough to include all those things on one record so it goes between melodic hard rock to schizophrenic heavy metal to country to really ambient stuff and it's all in one place. I'm using a gospel choir, a string section and a horn section for this one as well."

When discussing the name of the album, Townsend said the title is a double entendre. The first meaning was inspired by the many plane journeys he and the band took whilst on tour, when Townsend noted how cool he thought it was that they were above the clouds, 'epi-cloud', while the second comes from the musical content of the album itself, 'epic-loud'.

On the topic of his decision to re-record "Kingdom", a song from his Physicist album, which came out in 2000 on Townsend's label HevyDevy Records, Townsend said, "We re-did 'Kingdom' because it's a live set staple, and so much better now than the Physicist recording."

Track listing

Personnel
Devin Townsend – guitars, vocals, keyboards
Anneke van Giersbergen – vocals
Ryan Van Poederooyen – drums
Brian Waddell – bass
Dave Young – guitars, additional keyboards

Production
Devin Townsend – mixing, engineering
Anthony Clarkson – artwork

Charts

References

2012 albums
Devin Townsend albums
Albums produced by Devin Townsend